The Northern Mariana Islands competed at the 2015 Pacific Games in Port Moresby, Papua New Guinea from 4 to 18 July 2015. The Northern Mariana Islands listed 26 competitors as of 4 July 2015. One competitor qualified for two sports.

Athletics

Northern Mariana Islands qualified 2 athletes in  track and field:

Men 

 Beouch Ogumoro Ngirchongor
 Orrin Ogumoro Pharmin

Beach volleyball

Northern Mariana Islands qualified 2 athletes in beach volleyball:

Men 
 Andrew Scott Johnson
 Clay McCullough-Stearns

Bodybuilding

Northern Mariana Islands qualified 3 athletes in bodybuilding:

Men 
 Gerald Christopher Panaligan Galang
 Donivan Benavente Mendiola
 Aaron James Quitugua Tomokane

Outrigger canoeing

Northern Mariana Islands qualified 8 athletes in va'a:

Men 
 Joe Erra Ayuyu
 Carter Aguon A. Calma
 Ketson Kabiriel
 James Ka Hing Lee
 Dino Anfranc Manning
 Benusto Jonavan Lisua Olopai
 Jose Tenorio Quan
 Jason Takami Tarkong
Joshua Ngiraibai Franklin Andrew

Golf

Northern Mariana Islands qualified 4 athletes in golf:

Men 
 Joseph Sasamoto Sasamoto Camacho
 Harry Taitano Nakamura Jr.
 Franco Mendiola Santos
 Luis Selepeo Tilipao

Sailing

Northern Mariana Islands qualified 3 athletes in sailing:

Women
 Janet Lynn McCullough
 Emma Rose McCullough-Stearns

Men 
 Anthony Richard Stearns

Swimming

Northern Mariana Islands qualified 3 athletes in swimming:

Women
 Victoria Olegovna Chentsova
 Angel Felice Delos Santos De Jesus

Men 
 Takumi Fukumoto Sugie

Triathlon

Northern Mariana Islands qualified 2 athletes in triathlon:

Men 
 Peter Balboni Prestley
 Anthony Richard Stearns

Notes

References

2015 in Northern Mariana Islands sports
Nations at the 2015 Pacific Games
Northern Mariana Islands at the Pacific Games